The Taiwan Electrical and Electronic Manufacturers' Association (TEEMA) is an organization based in Neihu District, Taipei, Taiwan.

History
The organization was founded in 1948.

References

External links
 

Organizations based in Taipei
Organizations established in 1948